Lingkana Palace is the residence of King Jigme Khesar Namgyel Wangchuck of Bhutan. The palace grounds are adjacent to the Tashichhodzong in the capital city of Thimphu.

It was here that the Queen consort Jetsun Pema gave birth to a son on 5 February 2016, Jigme Namgyel Wangchuck. On 19 March 2020, Queen Jetsun Pema gave birth to her second son, Jigme Ugyen Wangchuck, also in this palace.

References

Buildings and structures in Thimphu
Palaces in Bhutan
Royal residences in Bhutan